Chandra Sturrup (born September 12, 1971) is a Bahamian track and field sprint athlete.

Career

She is a 100m specialist and the Bahamian record holder for the women's 100m with a personal best of 10.84 set in Lausanne, Switzerland on July 5, 2005. Sturrup is an alumnus of Norfolk State University, and has taken part in almost every major event since 1991 after the birth of her son, Shawn Murray Jr. For most of her career, she was coached by Trevor Graham.

Sturrup competed at the 2008 Summer Olympics in Beijing at the 100 metres sprint. In her first-round heat she placed first in front of Kelly-Ann Baptiste and Lina Grincikaite in a time of 11.30 to advance to the second round. There she improved her time to 11.16 and placed third behind Sherone Simpson and Muna Lee. In her semi final Sturrup finished in fifth position with 11.22 seconds, causing elimination. Her fellow Bahamian Debbie Ferguson qualified for the final with the same time, but she finished fourth in her semi final.

Achievements 

2005 World Championships in Athletics - fourth place (100 m)
2003 World Championships in Athletics - bronze medal (100 m)
2002 Commonwealth Games - gold medal (4 × 100 m relay)
2001 World Championships in Athletics - bronze medal (100 m)
2001 World Indoor Championships in Athletics - gold medal (60 m)
2000 Olympic Games - gold medal (4 × 100 m relay)
2000 Olympic Games - sixth place
1999 World Championships in Athletics - gold medal (4 × 100 m relay)
1999 World Championships in Athletics - seventh place (100 m)
1998 Commonwealth Games - gold medal (100 m)
1997 World Indoor Championships in Athletics - silver medal (60 m)
1996 Olympic Games - silver medal (4 × 100 m relay)
1996 Olympic Games - fourth place (100 m)

References

External links

1971 births
Living people
Bahamian female sprinters
Athletes (track and field) at the 1996 Summer Olympics
Athletes (track and field) at the 2000 Summer Olympics
Athletes (track and field) at the 2004 Summer Olympics
Athletes (track and field) at the 2008 Summer Olympics
Athletes (track and field) at the 2012 Summer Olympics
Athletes (track and field) at the 1999 Pan American Games
Athletes (track and field) at the 2007 Pan American Games
Athletes (track and field) at the 1998 Commonwealth Games
Athletes (track and field) at the 2002 Commonwealth Games
Olympic athletes of the Bahamas
Olympic gold medalists for the Bahamas
Olympic silver medalists for the Bahamas
Commonwealth Games gold medallists for the Bahamas
Commonwealth Games medallists in athletics
Pan American Games gold medalists for the Bahamas
Pan American Games bronze medalists for the Bahamas
Pan American Games medalists in athletics (track and field)
World Athletics Championships medalists
World Athletics Indoor Championships winners
World Athletics Indoor Championships medalists
Medalists at the 2000 Summer Olympics
Medalists at the 1996 Summer Olympics
Olympic gold medalists in athletics (track and field)
Olympic silver medalists in athletics (track and field)
Central American and Caribbean Games gold medalists for the Bahamas
Central American and Caribbean Games bronze medalists for the Bahamas
Competitors at the 1993 Central American and Caribbean Games
Competitors at the 1998 Central American and Caribbean Games
Goodwill Games medalists in athletics
World Athletics Championships winners
Central American and Caribbean Games medalists in athletics
Competitors at the 1998 Goodwill Games
Competitors at the 2001 Goodwill Games
Medalists at the 1999 Pan American Games
Medalists at the 2007 Pan American Games
Olympic female sprinters
Medallists at the 1998 Commonwealth Games
Medallists at the 2002 Commonwealth Games